Camille Benjamin (born June 22, 1966) is an American former professional tennis player.

Benjamin played on the WTA tour from 1981 to 1994. She reached the semifinals of the French Open in 1984, defeating Cláudia Monteiro, Jamie Golder, Catrin Jexell, Sabrina Goleš and Lisa Bonder before losing to Chris Evert.

Benjamin is the daughter of Panamanian immigrants. Her father, Carl Benjamin, was a math professor at Bakersfield College and had played college tennis at Central State College in Xenia, Ohio.

WTA Tour finals

Singles 2

Doubles 3 (1–2)

ITF titles

Singles (1)

References
 Sundiata A. Djata. Blacks at the Net: Black Achievement in the History of Tennis Vol. 1, p. 78-79.

External links

 
 

African-American female tennis players
American female tennis players
Sportspeople from Cleveland
Tennis people from Ohio
1966 births
Living people
21st-century African-American people
21st-century African-American women
20th-century African-American sportspeople
20th-century African-American women
20th-century African-American people